Independent Division of Gansu Provincial Military District(1st Formation) was formed on July 1, 1966 from the Public Security Contingent of Gansu province. The division was composed of five regiments (1st to 5th) and two independent battalions, a total of 9247 personnel.

In Autumn 1966, 5th Regiment was detached and moved to Sichuan.

In March 1983 4th Regiment exchanged its position and designation with 6th Regiment of Independent Division of Qinghai Provincial Military District.

On April 18th 1969 it exchanged its position and designation with Independent Division of Shaanxi Provincial Military District and became the second formation of Independent Division of Shaanxi Provincial Military District() with 2 of its regiments (1st to 3rd). The division was then composed of:
1st Infantry Regiment (former 2nd Regiment of Gansu Independent Division);
2nd Infantry Regiment (former 1st Regiment of Gansu Independent Division);
3rd Infantry Regiment (former 5th Regiment of Gansu Independent Division);
4th Infantry Regiment (former 2nd Regiment of Qinghai Independent Division).

In December 1970 5th Independent Infantry Regiment of Shaanxi Provincial Military District attached to the division and became its 5th Regiment.

On July 1, 1976 the division was disbanded. All its regiments became independent.

References
中国各省军区独立师的历史沿革, https://web.archive.org/web/20160918225002/http://www.360doc.com/content/13/1205/20/1164894_334784330.shtml

Infantry divisions of the People's Liberation Army
Military units and formations established in 1966
Military units and formations disestablished in 1976